Pernilla Lindberg (born 13 July 1986) is a Swedish professional golfer on the U.S.-based LPGA Tour and the Ladies European Tour. Her only professional win to date came at the ANA Inspiration, a major championship,

Early life
Lindberg was born and grew up in Bollnäs in the province of Hälsingland, Gävleborg County, Sweden. As a youth in Sweden, she was an alpine  Her father Jan was one of the best players in the local golf club, Bollnäs Golf Club, in the 1970s.

2002--2004, Lindberg won seven national youth tournaments in Sweden.

Amateur career
Lindberg was a member of the winning Swedish team at the 2006 European Lady Juniors' Team Championship at Golf Club de Pan, Netherlands.

Two years later Lindberg was part of winning Swedish teams at both the 2008 European Ladies' Team Championship and the 2008 Espirito Santo Trophy.

Lindberg played college golf in the United States at Oklahoma State University in Stillwater, and graduated in May 2009 with a bachelor's degree in international business.

Professional career
She joined the Duramed Futures Tour in June 2009 and qualified at the end of the year for both the LPGA Tour and the LET for 2010.

Lindberg won the 2018 ANA Inspiration, a major championship, for her first professional win. She prevailed in a sudden-death playoff, which extended to eight holes, over Inbee Park and Jennifer Song. Despite holding a three-shot lead after 54 holes, Lindberg shot 71 in the final round. In the final pairing, she birdied the 72nd hole to finish at  tied with Park and Song. In the playoff, Song was eliminated on the third extra hole when Park and Lindberg both birdied. After another try, the remaining two parred the hole and play was suspended due to  On Monday morning, the playoff resumed on the 10th hole, then went to 17 and back to 18. Still tied after seven extra holes, the players returned to #10, where Lindberg sank a  birdie putt, while Park missed hers from  The victory boosted Lindberg′s world ranking  from 95 to a

Personal life
On 31 January 2019, Lindberg married Daniel Taylor, who had been her caddie for several seasons.

Professional wins (1)

LPGA Tour wins (1)

LPGA Tour playoff record (1–0)

Major championships

Wins (1)

1 Defeated Park and Song in a sudden-death playoff: Lindberg (5-5-4-5-4-3-5-3), Park (5-5-4-5-4-3-5-x) and Song (5-5-5).

Results timeline
Results not in chronological order before 2019 or in 2020.

^ The Evian Championship was added as a major in 2013

CUT = missed the half-way cut
NT = no tournament
"T" = tied

Summary

Most consecutive cuts made – 5 (2018 ANA – 2018 Evian)
Longest streak of top-10s – 1 (twice)

LPGA Tour career summary 

 through the 2021 season

LET career summary

 through 2 April 2018

Futures Tour summary

joined in June at mid-season

World ranking
Position in Women's World Golf Rankings at the end of each calendar year.

Team appearances
Amateur

European Girls' Team Championship (representing Sweden): 2003, 2004 (winners)
Junior Solheim Cup (representing Europe): 2003 (winners)
Vagliano Trophy (representing the Continent of Europe): 2005, 2007 (winners)
European Ladies' Team Championship (representing Sweden): 2005, 2007, 2008 (winners)
European Lady Junior's Team Championship (representing Sweden): 2006 (winners)
Espirito Santo Trophy (representing Sweden): 2008 (winners)

Professional
International Crown (representing Sweden): 2014, 2018

References

External links

Swedish female golfers
Oklahoma State Cowgirls golfers
LPGA Tour golfers
Ladies European Tour golfers
Winners of LPGA major golf championships
Olympic golfers of Sweden
Golfers at the 2016 Summer Olympics
People from Bollnäs
Golfers from Orlando, Florida
1986 births
Living people
Sportspeople from Gävleborg County